Marq Torien (born Mark Joseph Maytorena on September 22, 1961 in Los Angeles, California) is the lead singer of the hard rock act BulletBoys. He is the only member to have remained with the group since the release of their self-titled debut album in 1988.

History
Prior to BulletBoys, Torien was a guitarist in the then-unsigned band Ratt, a guitarist for the band Hawk, a member of Motown recording artists Kagny & the Dirty Rats, a lead vocalist briefly for the band King Kobra.

In 1984, Torien formed the band Touch with multi-instrumentalist Marc Danzeisen, future Icon  frontman Jerry Harrison, and future Chalk FarM bassist Orlando Sims.  The group recorded a five song demo, which was heard by Sylvester Stallone during his search for new acts to perform songs for Rocky IV.  The band recorded "The Sweetest Victory" which did not appear in the film but was included on the soundtrack.  The song was featured in Stallone's director's cut of the film in 2021.

In addition to periodic BulletBoys ventures, Torien's solo projects included Sexual Chocolate, Ten-Cent Billionaires, and This.

Torien added vocals on the track "Texas Lawman" From The Regulators on their 1993 self-titled album on Polygram/Polydor.
 
Torien provided lead vocals for two tracks on Cherry St.'s second album Monroe in 1994. The tracks being "Dogtown" and "One More Tonight" 
 
In the book Off the Rails by Rudy Sarzo, Sarzo tells a story about Torien's audition for the Ozzy Osbourne band after the death of Randy Rhoads as the group's guitarist.

Discography

with Kagny & The Dirty Rats
 Kagny & The Dirty Rats (1983)

with Touch
 Rocky IV (1985)
Song: "The Sweetest Victory"

with Bulletboys
 BulletBoys (1988)
 Freakshow (1991)
 Za-Za (1993)
 Acid Monkey (1995)
 Sophie (2003)
 10¢ Billionaire (2009)
 Rocked and Ripped (2011)
 Elefante' (2015)
 From Out of the Skies (2018)

with King Kobra
 The Lost Years (1999)

References

External links

   
Official BulletBoys Myspace page
Official Marq Torien Myspace page

American heavy metal singers
American rock guitarists
American male guitarists
American hard rock musicians
Glam metal musicians
Ratt members
King Kobra members
BulletBoys members
Living people
1961 births
20th-century American guitarists